Fabián Lannutti (born 28 July 1964) is an Argentine judoka. He competed in the men's half-heavyweight event at the 1984 Summer Olympics.

References

External links
 

1964 births
Living people
Argentine male judoka
Olympic judoka of Argentina
Judoka at the 1984 Summer Olympics
Place of birth missing (living people)
Pan American Games medalists in judo
Pan American Games bronze medalists for Argentina
Medalists at the 1983 Pan American Games
Judoka at the 1983 Pan American Games
21st-century Argentine people
20th-century Argentine people